Heart- and neural crest derivatives-expressed protein 2 is a protein that in humans is encoded by the HAND2 gene.

Function 

The protein encoded by this gene belongs to the basic helix-loop-helix family of transcription factors. This gene product is one of two closely related family members, the HAND proteins Hand1 and Hand2, which are asymmetrically expressed in the developing ventricular chambers and play an essential role in cardiac morphogenesis. Working in a complementary fashion, they function in the formation of the right ventricle and aortic arch arteries, implicating them as mediators of congenital heart disease. In addition, this transcription factor plays an important role in limb and branchial arch development. In one study, it was found that a missense mutation of the Hand2 protein in patients with the congenital heart disease (CHD) Tetralogy of Fallot experienced significantly decreased Hand2 interactions with other key developmental genes such as GATA4 and NKX2.5. Hand2 mutations have the potential to be genes for the future study of right ventricle stenosis and its pathogenesis. In avian species, Hand2 has been shown to be expressed in developing gut tissue and is believed to contribute to the formation of enteric neurons.

Hand2 also plays a critical role in the establishment of a proper implantation environment for pregnancy in mice. The induction of Hand2 by progesterone-dependent mechanisms in uterine stromal tissue suppresses fibroblast growth factors (FGFs) that would otherwise stimulate estrogen producing pathways and impair embryo implantation.

Hand2 plays a role in lower jaw formation and tongue morphogenesis in mice by suppressing the homeobox genes Dlx5 and Dlx6.

Interactions 

HAND2 has been shown to interact with GATA4, NKX2.5, PPP2R5D, PHOX2A., TWIST1, and TWIST2.

Clinical significance 
Hand2 interactions with TWIST1 and TWIST2 genes are critical for proper limb development. Recent literature shows over dosage of Hand2 can result in many defects in the limbs, face, heart, and lower lumbar vertebrae. In this instance, trisomy of the hand2 gene can directly cause human congenital heart disease.

Hand2 gene hypermethylation and epigenetic silencing has also been implicated to increase the development of endometrial cancer. Mounting evidence showing its methylation increased chances of premalignant endometrial lesions. Hand2, in addition to its other functions in the developing heart and limbs, has been found to be an important transcription factor seen in the endometrial stroma. In fact, in mice with the Hand2 gene knocked out, they developed premalignant lesions as they grew older, further providing evidence of its role in endometrial cancer development. These findings have led to Hand2 becoming a potentially promising biomarker for early detection of endometrial cancer and may be used to predict its treatment.

Regulation of Hand2
HAND2 is an important transcription factor in development of the endothelial to mesenchymal transition (EMT) which allows for the development of the cardiac cushion in the atrioventricular canal which forms the mitral and tricuspid valves. The Hand2 gene regulatory network contains many genes that function in the EMT process, most notably Snail1, whose expression is lost if Hand2 is deficient. Since HAND2 is essential for separation of the atria and ventricles, a mutation in this gene has been linked to ventricular septal defects. Deficiency in HAND2 is only partially replaced by SNAIL1. The expression of Hand2 is regulated by an upstream long non-coding RNA called Upperhand (Uph) that is needed for RNA polymerase II to transcribe Hand2. If Uph is not present, then there is a decrease in the expression of Hand2 and thus a decrease in cardiac development. When Uph was knocked out, the right ventricular chamber did not develop and had a similar phenotype as when Hand2 is knocked out. In addition, Hand2 expression was absent in the atria, ventricles, and outflow tract of the heart and was reduced in the brachial arches and limb buds.

References

Further reading

External links 
 

Transcription factors